Ngamba Island Chimpanzee Sanctuary, is an island sanctuary in Uganda, dedicated to the care of orphaned eastern chimpanzees, that have been rescued by the Uganda Wildlife Authority. Many of the chimpanzees were rescued from poachers and are unlikely to survive reintroduction to the wild.

Location
The island supports a rich diversity of natural wildlife and provides a variety of natural foods for the chimpanzees. It is set up as an eco-friendly project with compost toilets, rainwater collection, proper waste management practices and solar energy for electricity and hot water.

Overview
The Sanctuary is managed by a non-profit organisation, the  Chimpanzee Sanctuary and Wildlife Conservation Trust (CSWCT). CSWCT is a partnership of six organizations committed to the welfare and conservation of wildlife. The Trustees are:
(a) Born Free Foundation (b) International Fund for Animal Welfare (c) Jane Goodall Institute (d) Uganda Wildlife Conservation Education Centre (UWEC) (e) Environmental Conservation Trust of Uganda (ECOTRUST) and (f) Uganda Wildlife Society.

The sanctuary is open all year round to visitors who pay a nominal entrance fee to view one or both of the chimpanzee feedings. Day and overnight visits (staying in luxury tents) are available and can be booked through the booking agent, Wild Frontiers Uganda.

History
Ngamba Island was gazetted in October 1998 to care for orphaned chimpanzees rescued from various parts of East Africa.

See also
 Lillian Ajarova
 Jane Goodall

References

External links

NgambaIsland.org
Ape Crusaders Feature in The Independent on Ngamba Island

1998 establishments in Uganda
Nature conservation in Uganda
Tourist attractions in Uganda
Primate sanctuaries
Nature reserves
Organizations established in 1998
Mukono District
Animal welfare organisations based in Uganda